The City of Brass is an American science fiction and fantasy novel written by S. A. Chakraborty. It is the first of The Daevabad Trilogy, followed by The Kingdom of Copper in 2019 and The Empire of Gold in 2020.

Publication
The City of Brass was published by HarperCollins subsidiary HarperVoyager, on November 14, 2017. It is five-hundred and thirty-two pages long, features illustrations and maps, and is printed in hardcover and paperback, and available in digital download. The press release describes the story as "an imaginative alchemy of The Golem and the Jinni, The Grace of Kings, and Uprooted, in which the future of a magical Middle Eastern kingdom rests in the hands of a clever and defiant young con artist with miraculous healing gifts." When asked about writing the novel in an interview for The Huffington Post, Chakraborty explains that it "began as a world-building experiment... the world that became The City of Brass–one I imagined djinn might have created by combining their nature and the influences of the particular human societies they lived amongst. It became a game with history and folklore providing the rules: I had to abide by what existed, but could imagine beyond that. For example, we have a few mentions of the Prophet Suleiman punishing djinn but not much beyond that. So, I tried to imagine what happened next: how that might have shaped their religion and politics... as well as dividing them."

Synopsis
The book begins in 18th-century Cairo and follows Nahri, a talented orphan con woman who uses palm reading and sleight of hand to swindle Ottoman nobles, and has healing powers. During an exorcism, she accidentally summons a djinn warrior named Darayavahoush e-Afshin, "Dara" for short. Recognizing her healing powers as belonging to the long-dead Nahids, a powerful magical family and ancient rulers of the djinn, he takes her on a journey to Daevabad, the city her ancestors built. Along the way they meet powerful magical creatures that are out to either help them or kill them, and their flight to Daevabad becomes one of survival. Along the way they grow close as Dara tells Nahri of the magical world she never believed in, and reveals its many prejudiced and political complications while trying to hide his own role in it.

The story also follows Alizayd al Qahtani, "Ali" for short; a devout Muslim and second son of the djinn king whose family currently rules Daevabad, and whose ancestors had violently overthrown the Nahids. Torn between being loyal to his family and his duty as the future Qaid--the military leader that will serve his brother Emir Muntadhir; he also secretly supports the Tanzeem, a group of half-human djinn (known as shafit) that fight against the oppression and cruelty leveled against their kind by the Qahtani rulers and other pureblooded djinn. 

The city and its many djinn tribes is a kindling box that King Ghassan al Qahtani holds together with an iron fist, and Nahri and Dara's arrival in Daevabad threatens to set it all on fire. Both as Nahri as the return of a Nahid healer that revitalizes her Daeva tribe that revered the Nahids and resented the djinn, and Dara as the ancient warrior whose brutality in the war 1400 years ago is still remembered and feared by present-day djinn. Nahri learns more about the healing arts, her new role as leader of the Daevas, and the complicated politics of the city, while Ali learns more about the corruption and prejudices of the city and his family's role in it. Dara meanwhile leaves the city with a group of djinn soldiers and Emir Muntadhir to chase rumors of ifrit sightings and is gone for months.
 
When Ali refuses his role as Qaid and his connection to the Tanzeem comes to light, King Ghassan forces him to become friends with Nahri as a way to warm her to their family so that eventually she and Emir Muntadhir can marry. By uniting the Qahtani and Nahid families, Ghassan hopes that it will put to past their ancient tribal hate. Ali quickly finds an in despite his awkwardness as both he and Nahri share a love for Cairo, books, and economics. Nahri meanwhile also has an ulterior motive by using Ali as a mark to gain information about the djinn and using that knowledge to protect herself and Dara. However they begin to grow close as Ali teaches Nahri how to read and how to use fire magic, while she tells Ali stories of home and helps him improve his Arabic. Their friendship is heavily criticized on both sides by their allies who see it as a betrayal to their tribe and politics.

Complications rise as Dara returns, and Nahri learns of the plot to marry her to Muntadhir. Ali meanwhile has a falling out with the Tanzeem and is nearly assassinated, while Muntadhir begins to truly question his brother's loyalty. As Nahri considers her life in the city and the future she wants to build, she makes a decision and goes to King Ghassan to barter for own bride price. Tensions boil over with the men later that night and a fight breaks out, sending Dara into a plan to rescue Nahri and run, while Ali returns to the infirmary for healing. 

Nahri refuses to escape with Dara and the life she's trying to build in Daevabad, and Ali intervenes. Their battle ends with Dara threatening to kill Ali if Nahri doesn't agree to flee with him, and Nahri concedes. Ali is taken prisoner, and the three make their way to a secret boat by the lake shore. Their escape is soon interrupted by a hidden warship full of soldiers, and a massacre ensues when Nahri unintentionally unleashes Dara's slave powers and he murders nearly everyone on the ship, including Ali. Nahri manages to talk Dara down after he scourges Muntadhir, but their escape is hindered by Ali, who has been possessed by the lake marid. The marid kills Dara by severing his slave ring from his body, and King Ghassan and his soldiers retake the boat.

In the aftermath, King Ghassan retaliates against the shafit in his search for those related to the Tanzeem, and retaliates against the Daevas and those who helped Dara's escape attempt or even question his death. Ali survives but is to be banished to Am Gezira in part for his mother's tribe's role in supporting the Tanzeem, and in part to hide his uncontrolled water magic. Muntadhir renounces Ali and grieves his gravely-injured love/bodyguard Jamshid while resenting Nahri and his marriage to her. Nahri deeply struggles with Dara's death, and has a meeting with King Ghassan where they continue their previous marriage agreement and is told about Dara and what happened in Qui-zi. She later is forced to denounce Dara to a gathered crowd of Daeva nobles who show deference to her, much to Ghassan's discontent. Kaveh and Nisreen discuss Jamshid and the Daeva situation, and hint how things could change if they can get Dara's recovered slave ring to Manizheh e-Nahid.

Reception
The novel was listed in Best Books of the Year by multiple media outlets, such as Library Journal, Vulture.com, The Verge and SyfyWire. In a review in The New York Times, columnist Suzanne Joinson says "it's clear that Chakraborty has great fun alluding to these tales," and continues "most enjoyable is the gusto with which everything is thrown into her story, from massacres to zombies to djinns."  A review by Paul Di Filippo in Locus compares the novel with One Thousand and One Nights in terms of its imagery and storylines, and summarizes by writing "with its blend of royal politesse, djinnish magic, human loves and fears, and Middle Eastern Machiavellianism, The City of Brass offers pleasures worthy of Scheherazade." Mahvesh Murad writes at Tor.com, "to most (western?) readers whose only experience of the djinn is Disney, The City of Brass is going to be a lush, entertaining fable inspired by Middle Eastern and Islamic folklore that has just enough familiar elements to not be considering worrying alien, and yet is exotic enough to thrill and entice and tick off diversity boxes in the right way."

The City of Brass was a finalist for several science fiction and fantasy awards, including the Crawford Award, Locus Award, British Fantasy Award, World Fantasy Award, and won the Booknest.eu award for best Debut Novel. Chakraborty narrowly missed the final ballot for the John W. Campbell award by a single vote.

References
Citations

Bibliography

2017 American novels
2017 fantasy novels
Jinn in popular culture
2017 debut novels
HarperCollins books